Gabi Schneider (born 1956, in Frankfurt am Main, Germany) is a Namibian geologist.

Education 
Schneider studied geology and mineralogy at Goethe University Frankfurt from 1974 to 1980. She obtained a Master of Science in economic geology and her PhD from the University of Frankfurt in 1980 and 1984 respectively.

Professional career 
Schneider worked as a senior geologist at the Geological Survey of Namibia in 1985 and was later appointed as its director in 1996. Her professional background includes economic and exploration geology, mineralogy and geochemistry, as well as management and administration. She holds an honorary life membership with the Geological Society of Namibia and is a registered scientist with the South Africa Council for Natural Scientists.

Leadership roles 
Schneider was President of the Organisation of African Geological Surveys from 2013 to 2016 and Vice Chairperson of the Environmental Investment Fund of Namibia. She is a Director of the Minerals Development Fund of Namibia, Vice Chairperson of the Board of Trustees of the Namibian Institute for Mining and Technology, a member of the Sustainable Development Council of Namibia, a member of the Benguela Current Commission, and a member of the Commission for the Implementation of the World Heritage Convention in Namibia, chairing its Technical Subcommittee. She is also a founding member of the Small Miners Association of Namibia.

Schneider is a member of the Natural Science Programme Committee of the Namibian National Committee for UNESCO and a senior advisor for UNESCO's Geopark Programme. She represents the African continent at the International Consortium of Geological Surveys and is chairing the Geology Advisory Board of the University of Namibia.

Books authorship 
Schneider authored books on Namibian Geology including The roadside geology of Namibia, Treasures of the Diamond Coast. A Century of Diamond Mining in. Namibia,  Passage Through Time: the Fossils of Namibia and co-authored environment awareness for sustainable development-a resource book for Namibia.

References 

People from Frankfurt
Goethe University Frankfurt alumni‎
Namibian geologists
1956 births
Living people